Carey Jason Phillip Hart (born July 17, 1975) is an American off-road truck racer, former professional freestyle motocross competitor, and former motorcycle racer. He is known for being the first motorcyclist to perform a back flip on a 250cc motorcycle during a competition, and for his company Hart & Huntington Tattoo & Clothing Company.

He and singer Pink have been married since 2006.

Career
Hart became a professional motorcyclist at 18 and started competing in the AMA supercross circuit. Two years before, he had sustained two broken femurs, broken tibia and fibula as well as fractured wrists, after he was blind-sided by a tractor working on the track he was riding on, smashing straight into the vehicle. Hart was among the first riders to begin competing in freestyle motocross in 1996. Hart was the first rider to publicly perform BMX trick the "superman seat grab" at IFMA events in 1998–99. He was also the first person to perform the "invert superman" seat grab at the 1999 Gravity Games in Providence, Rhode Island. This trick is now known as the "Hart Attack". In 1999 Hart took home the bronze medal at the Summer Gravity Games and Gold at the Australian X Games.

During the 2000 Gravity Games in Providence, Rhode Island, Hart attempted the first back flip on a 250 cc motorcycle in competition. Hart is credited with the first "attempt" of a back-flip as he over-rotated his flip and suffered a hard landing, displacing him off the seat. 2000 saw Hart win several FMX competitions and honors including the Silver at the Las Vegas LXD Freeride MotoX and Toyota's Trick of the Week.

At the 2001 X-Games in Philadelphia, Hart attempted the backflip again for the best trick competition but suffered a bad crash coming off his bike at the beginning of the rotation. His injuries included several broken bones and ribs along with a bruised tailbone. It was there he met his future wife, singer Pink. In 2002, Hart again picked up the gold medal at the Australian X-Games as well as gaining the silver medal in the MotoX Best Trick at the Summer X Games in Los Angeles. The same year, Hart participated in the Tony Hawk's Boom Boom HuckJam Tour.

At the 2002 X-Games in Philadelphia, Hart successfully completed the backflip in the best trick competition picking up the silver medal behind Mike Metzger, who landed a no-footed backflip. The same year, Hart participated in the Gumball 3000, an annual British 3,000-mile (4,800 km) international road rally which takes place on public roads. 2003's route was from San Francisco to Miami. He is also featured in the film Gumball 3000; The Movie. The biographical documentary Goodtimes With Carey Hart was also released in 2003. Hart again participated in the Tony Hawk's Boom Boom HuckJam tour but was seriously injured on the first night, having to bail into the scaffolding to avoid hitting a skater after the mistiming of their jumps. Hart broke both his arms and legs as well as suffering severe blood clotting during surgery. The crash took him out of competition for three years.

In 2004, Hart and John Huntington opened Hart & Huntington Tattoo Company in Las Vegas. The A&E network followed Hart and the workings of the shop on the reality show Inked. Hart and Huntington Tattoo Company also launched a clothing line based on the designs of the artists at the store. With H&H's expansion, the clothing line is now based on the tattoo/action sports lifestyle and culture. Soon after the opening of the Las Vegas store, John Huntington sold his 48 percent ownership back to Hart. In 2006, Huntington filed a lawsuit against Carey, alleging he owed large amounts of money for his trademark and likeness. Hart reportedly hired high-profile Las Vegas attorney Gene Porter to resolve the case through a mediation settlement, which was in turn successful.

In 2005 Hart was the host for ABC's Live's X Games FMX coverage and was a cast member on the fifth season of the VH1 reality show The Surreal Life. In 2006, two Hart & Huntington Tattoo Company stores opened in Hawaii and Cabo. Hart again took part in Gumball 3000, which saw the drivers race from London to Los Angeles.

In 2007, Hart formed his first Supercross team, the H&H/Rockstar Moto Team, which included him as a team rider, Hart finished 12th in 2007 AMA Supermoto Series. Kenny Watson has been team manager from the beginning. In 2011, Hart welcomed a new title sponsor Dodge Motorsports who entered the Supercross space for the first time. It was also in 2007 that the Hart & Huntington Orlando store was opened in Universal CityWalk.

In July 2008, Hart teamed up with Cory McCormack, Jason Giambi, Benji Madden and Joel Madden to create Las Vegas nightclub "Wasted Space". The club was designed by Hart, McCormack and Zeff Design. Wasted Space was voted Best New Bar in Vegas 2008. Also in 2008, Hart released "Inked: The book" which covered individuals stories behind their tattoos, including Carey's own story and his father's Tom Hart. In late 2008 Hart & Huntington's Cabo store was closed.

In 2009, Hart teamed up with Premiere MotorSports Group (PMG) to launch the Hart and Huntington Off-Road team which is a Short Course Truck Team led by Ryan Busnardo, Nick Kilian and Scot Demmer. Hart became attracted to the sport previously from being a fan of CORR (Championship Off-Road Racing Series) which ended in 2008. Hart and Huntington Off-Road secured over 40 podium finishes. Hart competed in the Lucas Oil Off Road Racing Series driving for the Team in the Unlimited 2 category (known in the past as a PRO 2), finishing 6th in Lucas Oil Off Road Racing Series and was nominated "Rookie of the Year" in LOORR Series.

In April 2009, H&H moved to a bigger store inside the Hard Rock Hotel & Casino in Las Vegas and created the Hart & Huntington Freestyle tour, which toured alongside Pink's arena tour in Australia. In 2010, Hart & Huntington opened a store in Niagara Falls, Canada. In August of the same year, Wasted Space closed to make way for the Hard Rock's new race and sports book. In 2011, Hart was awarded the 1st R.A.D. Lifetime achievement award. and hosted of MTV2's “Burn Out” series. In 2011 H&H Hawaii closed.

Prior to the 2012 X Games, Hart announced his participation of the Moto X Speed & Style event would be his last competition. Hart got to the quarter-finals but was eliminated by Edgar Torronteras.

For 2013, Hart announced the joining forces of Hart's Dodge/Sycuan Casino Racing team with Ricky Carmichael and factory support from Suzuki and Yoshimura research and development forming 'RCH Racing'.

During Hart's career, he has been featured in nationwide ad campaigns for Ford, Dunkin' Donuts, Fox, DVS and Mountain Dew as well as in such print publications as Paper Magazine, Teen People, ESPN The Magazine, Rolling Stone, Prick and, Skinnie, and has been on the covers of numerous motocross and tattoo magazines.

Hart has made cameos in several music videos, Including Kid Rock's video "Bawitdaba" jumping the trailer park, He has appeared in Pink's "Just Like a Pill", "So What", "Raise Your Glass", "Just Give Me a Reason", and "True Love" videos. On the 2000 Australian Warped Tour, he played bass with the band Pennywise.

Hart has also appeared on the Late Show with David Letterman, Inked, MTV's Life of Ryan, Rove Live (Australia), appeared on The Today Show, was a guest in Talkin' 'bout Your Generation and has starred in several films including ESPN/Touchstone Pictures’ IMAX film, Ultimate X, Terrafirma 5, Frenzno Smooth, Flipped Out, Crush: A Transworld Motocross Film, Seth II and several of the "Crusty Demons" series. He also has had cameo appearances in xXx and Charlie's Angels: Full Throttle.

Personal life
Hart was raised in Las Vegas. His parents divorced when he was very young, he and his younger brother Anthony Hart were raised by their father, Tom Hart, a construction company owner. He is the oldest of three siblings.

Hart began dating singer Pink after meeting her in Philadelphia, Pennsylvania, at the 2001 X Games. After four years of dating, Pink proposed to Hart in June 2005 via a pit board during one of his races in Mammoth Lakes, California. She was holding a sign initially asking "Will you marry me?" At first he ignored her and completed another lap of the race; it was only when she changed the sign and held it up again with it now saying, "I'm serious!", that Hart pulled out of the race to pick Pink up. They married at the Four Seasons resort in Costa Rica on January 7, 2006.

The couple announced in February 2008 that they had separated. During their separation, Carey's brother Tony died due to injuries sustained in a motocross competition in August 2008. His estranged wife  (Pink) supported him through the loss. Following Tony's death, the Hart family formed the XTRM Hart Foundation for a brief fundraising effort in his memory. The Foundation's aim was to increase awareness of motocross safety and raise money to purchase airfences to use during supermoto races. Red and black wristbands were created to symbolize The Hart Foundation and given to those who donated to the Fund.

In March 2009, Hart stated he and Pink were "dating". He also said the couple was attempting to work things out, stating, "Sometimes you have to take a couple of steps back to move forward". In April 2009, Pink stated that the couple had gone to marriage counseling and were back together – they were never divorced.

In June 2011, Hart and Pink welcomed their first child, a daughter named Willow Sage. The couple released photographs of their daughter via People magazine. The money paid to the Harts was donated to children's charities, including the Ronald McDonald House and Autism Speaks. On November 12, 2016, Pink announced she was expecting her second child with Hart. Their second child, a son named Jameson Moon, was born in December 2016.

In 2013, Hart appeared in several of Pink's music videos including "Just Give Me a Reason", released on February 5, 2013 as well as "True Love", released on July 1, 2013. He and their daughter Willow appeared in the video for "Just Like Fire" in 2016 and Hart and both children appear in the 2021 video for "All I Know So Far".

Career history and achievements 

 2012 Reached Quarter Finals X Games XVIII, Speed and Style
 2011 Riders Above Dirt R.A.D. Lifetime Achievement Award
 2011 4th X Games XVII, Speed and Style
 2011 Celebrity Dodge Viper Challenge
 2010 18th Lucas Oil Off Road Racing Series. Unlimited 2
 2009 6th in Lucas Oil Off Road Racing Series, Unlimited 2
 2009 Nominated Rookie of the Year in the Lucas Oil Off Road Racing Series
 2009 Lucas Oil Off Road Racing Series Team of the Year
 2009 19th X Games XV, Supermoto
 2008 17th X Games XIV, Supermoto
 2007 12th AMA Supermoto Series
 2007 15th X Games XIII, Supermoto
 2007 10th AMA Supermoto, Galveston, Texas
 2003 Participated Gumball 3000
 2006 14th X Games XII, Supermoto
 2006 21st AMA Supermoto Series
 2003 Participated Gumball 3000
 2002  Australian X Games
 2001  Salt Lake LXD Freeride MotoX, Big Air
 2001 7th Salt Lake LXD Freeride MotoX, FreeStyle
 2001 15th X GamesVII, Best Trick
 2000 First Ever Backflip Attempt on a 250cc Bike
 2000 10th Gravity Games, FreeStyle
 2000 Mountain Dew Trick of the Week
 2000 Toyota Trick of the Week
 2000 5th Los Angeles LXD FreeRide MotoX
 2000 5th Irwindale LXD Freeride MotoX
 2000  Las Vegas LXD Freeride MotoX
 2000 10th World FreeRide Rankings
 1999 First Performed invert superman a.k.a. The Hart Attack
 1999 4th San Francisco Vans Triple Crown FreeStyle
 1999 8th San Diego Vans Triple Crown FreeStyle
 1999 4th – Four Leaf Entertainment Series
 1999  Australian X Games
 1999  Costa Mesa LXD Freeride MotoX, Best Whip
 1999  Costa Mesa LXD Freeride MotoX, FreeRide
 1999  Costa Rican Supercross
 1999  LXD Orange County Jump Contest
 1998  Free Air Festival Tour Las Vegas, Freestyle
 1998 4th Free Air Festival Tour, Freestyle

Filmography

Film

Television

References

External links

1975 births
Living people
People from Seal Beach, California